Gutu North is a constituency of the National Assembly of the Parliament of Zimbabwe, located in Masvingo Province. Its current MP since the 2018 election is Yeukai Simbanegavi of ZANU–PF.

Electoral history 
In a 2004 by-election, Air Chief Marshal Josiah Tungamirai (ZANU-PF) was elected to the House to succeed incumbent Simon Muzenda, who had died the year before, Tungamirai died the next year.

In 2008, Maramwidze Edmore (MDC) won against Machaya Frank (ZANU-PF) for the constituency. The current Member of Parliament is Ticharwa Madondo (ZANU-PF) for the constituency. His term will expire sometime in July 2018 when national election are expected to be held. Ticharwa Madondo became MP after winning national elections in 2013.

References 

Gutu District
Masvingo Province
Parliamentary constituencies in Zimbabwe